Luis Domingos Antonio Cazengue (born August 11, 1969), nicknamed Luizinho, is a former Angolan footballer who began his career in Angola, and played primarily in Portugal.

Playing career 
Cazengue began his career with Atlético Petróleos de Luanda in the Girabola. During his tenure with Luanda he won the Girabola league title five times from 1986 to 1990, and won the Taça de Angola in 1987, and 1992. In 1992, he went abroad to Portugal to sign with Lusitano G.C.of the Segunda Liga. In 1993, he had a tenure with C.D. Fátima. The following season, he signed with S.C. Braga of the Primeira Liga, where he appeared in 26 matches and scored two goals. After his tenure in the Primeira Liga he spend time with SC Lamego, Académico de Viseu FC, Clube Caçadores das Taipas, Lusitânia F.C., and F.C. Oliveira do Hospital. In 2002, he was loaned to Toronto Supra of the Canadian Professional Soccer League. He made his debut on August 29, 2002 in a match against Durham Flames, and scored a goal in a 5-2 victory. Unfortunately during his tenure with Toronto the club finished last in the Eastern Conference, and failed to clinch a postseason berth.

International career 
Cazengue was selected for the Angola national football team roster for the 1996 African Cup of Nations. He made an appearance in the tournament against South Africa, where Angola lost the match to a score of 1-0.

Honours

Club
Petro Atlético
Girabola: 1986, 1987, 1988, 1989, 1990
Taça de Angola: 1987, 1992

References 

1969 births
Living people
Angolan footballers
Angolan expatriate footballers
Angola international footballers
1996 African Cup of Nations players
Atlético Petróleos de Luanda players
Lusitano G.C. players
C.D. Fátima players
S.C. Braga players
S.C. Lamego players
Académico de Viseu F.C. players
SC Toronto players
Canadian Soccer League (1998–present) players
Primeira Liga players
Liga Portugal 2 players
Expatriate footballers in Portugal
Expatriate soccer players in Canada
Angolan expatriate sportspeople in Portugal
Angolan expatriate sportspeople in Canada
Association football forwards
Clube Caçadores das Taipas players
F.C. Oliveira do Hospital players